Qorqan or Qorğan may refer to:
Kazakh name of Kurgan, Russia
Qorqan, Shabran, Azerbaijan
Qorqan, Fuzuli, Azerbaijan
Qorqan, Iran